Hapantali, also known as Hapantaliya, is an Anatolian and Luwian pastoral goddess.

Hapantali cares for the sheep of Istanu. She also helps moon god Arma/Kaskuh, when he falls down from sky, and takes part in the conference of gods when Telipinu is back.

Literature
Volkert Haas: Die hethitische Literatur, Walter de Gruyter GmbH & Co. KG, Berlin 2006, pages 110 f., 120 f., 

Hittite deities
Luwian goddesses
Pastoral goddesses